Richard J. Gambino (1935–2014) was a distinguished American material scientist best known for his pioneering work with amorphous magnetic materials.

Gambino received his BA in 1957 from the University of Connecticut, and MS in 1976 from the Polytechnic Institute of New York University. He served from 1956–60 as a Physics Scientist at the US Army Signal Corps Research Lab, a metallurgist from 1960–61 at Pratt & Whitney, and from 1961–1993 as a member of the research staff at IBM Yorktown. In 1993 he became a professor at Stony Brook University.

In 1992, Gambino received the IEEE Morris N. Liebmann Memorial Award together with Praveen Chaudhari and Jerome J. Cuomo, "for the discovery of amorphous magnetic films used in magneto-optic data storage systems". He received the National Medal of Technology in 1995 for the development of amorphous magnetic materials used for magneto-optic disk media.

He was also elected a member of the National Academy of Engineering in 2004 for the discovery of magnetic anisotropy, the enabling technology of magneto-optical recording.

He is an IEEE Fellow and holds 40 patents.

References 

 Biography, SUNY Stonybrook
 IEEE Morris N. Liebmann Memorial Award recipients

21st-century American physicists
Living people
Polytechnic Institute of New York University alumni
1935 births